Old Allegany County Courthouse is a historic courthouse located at Angelica in Allegany County, New York. It was built in 1819 and used until 1892, when the county seat was moved to Belmont, New York.  Since then, it has been used as school rooms, church, gymnasium, polling place, and as town offices for the town of Angelica. It is located within the Angelica Park Circle Historic District.

It was listed on the National Register of Historic Places in 1972.

See also
National Register of Historic Places listings in Allegany County, New York

References

External links
Old Allegany County Courthouse - Angelica, NY - U.S. National Register of Historic Places on Waymarking.com

Courthouses on the National Register of Historic Places in New York (state)
County courthouses in New York (state)
Government buildings completed in 1819
Buildings and structures in Allegany County, New York
National Register of Historic Places in Allegany County, New York